Coturnix is a genus of five extant species and five to eight known extinct species of Old World quail.

Range
These species are distributed throughout Africa, Eurasia, Australia, and formerly New Zealand. An extinct radiation of flightless, insular species is known through fossil remains from Macaronesia, which were likely wiped out by human arrival.

Habits
Quail of Coturnix live in pairs or small social groups and form larger groups during migration. Not all species migrate, but most are capable of extremely rapid, upward flight to escape from danger. Unlike related genera, Old World quail do not perch in trees. They devote much of their time to scratching and foraging for seeds and invertebrates on the ground. Typical habitats are dense vegetation such as grasslands, bushes alongside rivers and cereal fields. They are heavily predated upon by diurnal hawks.

Taxonomy
The genus Coturnix was introduced in 1764 by the French naturalist François Alexandre Pierre de Garsault. The type species is the common quail (Coturnix coturnix). The genus name is the Latin for the common quail. The genus contains six species, of which one, the New Zealand quail (Coturnix novaezelandiae), is now extinct but was described from a living specimen. The brown quail (S. ypsilophora), king quail (S. chinensis) and blue quail (S. adansonii), were formerly classified in this genus, but were later reclassified into Synoicus.

The quails are related to the African spurfowl, jungle bush quail,  snowcocks and rock partridges, which together with the species of Coturnix, Synoicus, and a few others make up a clade called Coturnicini, a tribe within the subfamily Pavoninae.

Species 

Fragmentary remains representing three other Coturnix species were also recovered from Macaronesia: Coturnix sp. A from Bugio Island in Madeira, Coturnix sp. B from Santa Maria in the Azores (likely representing another extinct island endemic species) and Coturnix sp. C from Graciosa in the Azores. Due to their fragmentary nature, it is uncertain whether these represented their own species or were synonymous with one of the already-described extinct Coturnix species or the extant common quail (Coturnix coturnix), which also has fossil remains known from Macaronesia and is still present there.

A fossil species from the Late Oligocene - Late Miocene of SW and Central Europe was described as Coturnix gallica. Another, C. donnezani, was widespread in Early Pliocene to Early Pleistocene Europe.

Footnotes

References
 Mlíkovský, Jirí (2002a): Early Pleistocene birds of Stránská skála, Czech Republic: 2. Absolon's cave. Sylvia 38: 19-28 [English with Czech abstract]. PDF fulltext
 The genetic link between the Chinese bamboo partridge (Bambusicola thoracica) and the chicken and junglefowls of the genus Gallus. A. Fumihito, T. Miyake, M. Takada, S. Ohno, and N. KondoYamashina, Institute for Ornithology, Chiba Prefecture, Japan.
 Phylogenetic analysis of gallinaceous birds inferred from mitochondrial NADH dehydrogenase subunit 5 gene sequences Wee Hui Kit Publisher: 2002.
 A Molecular Phylogeny of the Pheasants and Partridges Suggests That These Lineages Are Not Monophyletic R. T. Kimball,* E. L. Braun,*,† P. W. Zwartjes,* T. M. Crowe,‡,§ and J. D. Ligon*

External links

 Raising Coturnix Quail Organically For Eggs And Meat

 
Bird genera
Taxa named by François Alexandre Pierre de Garsault